Surviving Summer is an Australian teen drama television series that premiered on June 3, 2022, on Netflix. The first season consists of 10 episodes. In November 2022, the series was renewed for a second season.

Plot 
Rebellious teenager Summer Torres is expelled from her high school in Brooklyn and sent to stay with the family of an old friend of her mother's in Australia, where she falls in with a clique of competitive surfers.

Production

Development 
The series is created by Joanna Werner and Josh Mapleston. Josh Mapleston, Magda Wozniak, Keir Wilkins, Gemma Crofts and Kirsty Fisher serve as writers. Ben Chessell serves as a director, with Sian Davies and Charlotte George also directing episodes in the first season. Joanna Werner and Stuart Menzies serve as executive producers. The series was initially conceived as a Parent Trap concept with two female cousins, but a request from Netflix to have the series appeal to boys as well led to one of the characters to be changed to a boy, Ari. Filming occurred in a number of places in Victoria's Surf Coast: Aireys Inlet, Anglesea, Wye River, Lorne, Cumberland River and Bell's Beach. It consisted of two units working concurrently: one filming the drama and a separate unit shooting the surfing.

A trailer for the series was released on May 17, 2022.

On November 18, 2022, the series was renewed for a second season.

Cast

Main
 Sky Katz as Summer Torres, a rebellious teenager from Brooklyn, New York who is sent to live with family friends in the small town of Shorehaven on the Great Ocean Road, Victoria, Australia.
 Kai Lewins as Ari Gibson
 Lilliana Bowrey as Poppy Tetanui, 
 Joao Gabriel Marinho as Marlon Sousa, a Brazilian emigree to Shorehaven
 Savannah La Rain as Bodhi Mercer

Recurring
 Chris Alessio as Manu Tetanui, Poppy's older brother and a surf coach
 Dustin Clare and Adrienne Pickering as Ari's parents, Thommo and Abbie
 Pacha Luque-Light as rival surfer Lily Tran
 Mitchell Hardaker as Griff Temple
 Charli Wookey as Sheridan Morehouse
 Kate Beahan as Margot Torres, Summer's mother

Episodes

References

2020s Australian drama television series
2022 Australian television series debuts
2020s teen drama television series
English-language Netflix original programming
Television series about teenagers
Television series about vacationing
Television shows set in Victoria (Australia)